The Jackson Staircase is a pair of Ancestral Puebloan steps cut into the cliff of Chaco Canyon, New Mexico. Located north of Chetro Ketl and east of Pueblo Alto, the stairs gave Chacoans access to the Great North Road. The feature is named after William Henry Jackson, who discovered the stairs in 1877.

References

Bibliography

Colorado Plateau
Ancestral Puebloans
Post-Archaic period in North America
Archaeological sites in New Mexico
Chaco Canyon
Chaco Culture National Historical Park